Anse aux Pins is an administrative district of Seychelles located on the island of Mahé. Soleil Island is part of the district.

Geography
Anse aux Pins is situated in the East Region of Mahe, and is bordered by Cascade, Pointe Larue, and Au Cap Districts. There are six sub-districts: Anse Faure, Anse Aux Pins Central, Bodamien, Cayole Estate, Capucin, and Reef Estate.

Politics

Election results

Demographics

The National Bureau of Statistics Seychelles estimates that there are 4,236 residents of Anse aux Pins as of 2019.

Transportation
The Seychelles Public Transport Corporation runs bus service through Anse aux Pins. The district's bus terminal was reconstructed in 2018.

Education
Anse aux Pins is served by Anse aux Pins Primary School.

See also
Mahé Island

References

Districts of Seychelles
Mahé, Seychelles